The 1960–61 season was Dinamo București's 12th season in Divizia A. Dinamo is again on the podium, ending the second position with 32 points, five fewer than CCA. Gheorghe Ene is ranked in the top three leading scorers, with 15 goals.

UTA-Dinamo match of the 14th day, would have re-arranged, according to a decision of the FRF Bureau because of unfavorable conditions of the game, but ultimately the result has been preserved.

Results

Squad 
Manager Traian Ionescu used the following standard squad: Iuliu Uţu (Gheorghe Cozma) – Cornel Popa, Ion Nunweiller, Nicolae Panait – Vasile Alexandru, Lică Nunweiller (Gheorghe Dragomir) – Vasile Anghel, Iosif Varga (Mircea Sasu), Gheorghe Ene (Constantin David), Ion Țîrcovnicu (Mircea Stoenescu), Haralambie Eftimie (Tiberiu Selymesi).

Transfers 

Traian Ionescu promotes Tiberiu Selymesi, Mircea Sasu and Mircea Stoenescu from Tineretul Dinamovist (Young Dinamo player). Ion Țîrcovnicu (Dinamo Bacău), Constantin David (Progresul) and Gheorghe Ene (Rapid) are brought. Meanwhile, Ion Motroc is transferred to Rapid.

References 
 www.labtof.ro
 www.romaniansoccer.ro

1960
Association football clubs 1960–61 season
Dinamo